Robin Hood F.C. is a football club based in Pembroke Parish, Bermuda, that competes in the Bermudian Premier Division.

History
The club was founded in 1977 and players were registered in the local Robin Hood pub. They have been in the Premier Division after winning promotion from the First Division in summer 2014. They had spent only a year in the second tier after suffering relegation from the Premier Division the year before.

Achievements

Domestic
Bermudian Premier Division: 1
 2016–17
Bermuda FA Cup: 3
 2015–16, 2017–18, 2018–19

Players

 For 2015–2016 season

Past internationals
The player(s) below had senior international cap(s) for their respective countries. Players whose name is listed, represented their countries before or after playing for Robin Hood FC.

  Kilian Elkinson
  Fredy Mascarenhas (2012–2015)

References

External links
 Club page - Bermuda FA

Football clubs in Bermuda
Association football clubs established in 1977
1977 establishments in Bermuda